Valdir Antonio Taddei (c.1962–2004) was a Brazilian professor of mammalogy, known for his expertise in bats and works on chiropteran phylogenetics and mammalian systematics. He had a PhD in Biological Sciences (Zoology) and a Graduation in Natural History from the Paulista State University Júlio de Mesquita Filho.

Species described by Valdir Antonio Taddei 

 Chiroderma vizottoi
 Dekeyser's nectar bat

Honors and awards 

 Eptesicus taddeii, a species of bat, was named after Valdir to honor his contribution to the study of bats.

References 

1960 births
2004 deaths
20th-century Brazilian zoologists